Gaurotes striatopunctata is an extinct species of beetle in the family Cerambycidae. It was described by Wickham in 1914.

References

Lepturinae
Beetles described in 1914